Sam McCready may refer to:

 Sam McCready, the central character in the 1989-1990 telefilm series Frederick Forsyth Presents
 Sam McCready, the main character in the 1991 Frederick Forsyth novel The Deceiver
 Sam McCready (actor) (born 1936), actor, director and writer from Belfast
 Max McCready (1918–1994), Samuel Maxwell McCready, Irish amateur golfer

See also
 Sam (disambiguation)
 McCready